Pécsi VSK (Pécsi Vasutas Sportkör) is a Hungarian sports club based in Pécs. The club was founded in 1919.

Pécsi VSK, or similar, may also refer to:

Active departments
Pécsi VSK-Pannonpower - Men's basketball
Pécsi VSK (men's water polo)
Pécsi VSK (men's football)
Pécsi VSK (men's water polo)
Pécsi VSK (women's football)
Pécsi VSK (athletics)
Pécsi VSK (boxing)
Pécsi VSK (judo)
Pécsi VSK (ski)
Pécsi VSK (orienteering)

Former departments
MiZo Pécsi VSK - Women's basketball

Olympic athletes
 1936. Berlin, András Bérczes (Bendekovics) András, football
 1952. Helsinki, Antal Lippay
 1952. Helsinki, Egon Solymossy, athletics
 1956. Melbourne, János Héder, gymnastics
 1964. Tokyo, Márta Tolnai, gymnastics
 1968. Mexico City, Róbert Honti, athletics
 2000. Sydney, Zoltán Czukor, athletics
 2000. Sydney, Zsolt Kürtösi, athletics

Sports teams in Hungary